The Trinidad Scorpion Butch T  is a Capsicum chinense cultivar that is among the hottest peppers in the world.  It is indigenous to Trinidad and Tobago. It was named by Neil Smith from The Hippy Seed Company, after he got the seeds originally from  Butch Taylor (the owner of Zydeco Farms in Woodville/Crosby, Mississippi, and a hot sauce company) who is responsible for propagating the pepper's seeds.  The "scorpion" peppers are referred to as such because the pointed end of the pepper is said to resemble a scorpion's stinger.

World record
The Trinidad scorpion 'Butch T' pepper was, for three years, ranked the most pungent ("hot") pepper in the world according to Guinness World Records. A laboratory test conducted in March 2011 measured a specimen at 1,463,700 Scoville heat units, officially ranking it the hottest pepper in the world at the time. One possible secret to the chili's heat, according to a cultivator of the pepper, is fertilizing the soil with the liquid runoff of a worm farm. In August 2017, Guinness World Records recognized the Carolina Reaper as the hottest pepper in the world, at 1,641,183 SHU.

See also 

 Race to grow the hottest pepper
 Trinidad Moruga scorpion

Note

References

Chili peppers
Trinidad and Tobago cuisine
Capsicum cultivars
Guinness World Records